The 1988 Atlantic 10 men's basketball tournament was played from March 5 to March 9, 1988. The tournament was played entirely at the WVU Coliseum in Morgantown, WV.  The winner was named champion of the Atlantic 10 Conference and received an automatic bid to the 1988 NCAA Men's Division I Basketball Tournament. The Temple Owls won the tournament for the second straight year, and third of the previous four.

The Most Outstanding Player from the tournament was Tom Garrick (Rhode Island), who averaged 31 points per game during the tournament.  The rest of the All-Championship team was: Ivan Brown (St. Joseph's), Howard Evans (Temple), Mark Macon (Temple), Carlton Owens (Rhode Island), and Mike Vreeswyk (Temple).

Bracket

* - Overtime

References

External links 
 Atlantic10.com

Atlantic 10 men's basketball tournament
Tournament
Atlantic 10 men's basketball tournament
Atlantic 10 men's basketball tournament